Robert Horn (or variants) may refer to:

Robert Horn (water polo) (1931–2019), American water polo player
Robert Horn (writer), American playwright and screenwriter
Robert E. Horn (born 1933), American political scientist and professor
Robbie Horn (born 1977), Scottish footballer
Bob Horn (broadcaster) (1916–1966), radio and TV presenter
Bob Horn (American football) (born 1954), National Football League linebacker

See also
Robert Horne (disambiguation)
Robert Van Horn, American lawyer and publisher